Oneida grisiella is a species of snout moth in the genus Oneida. It is found in the US state of Texas.

References

Moths described in 1991
Epipaschiinae